Events from the year 1564 in Sweden

Incumbents
 Monarch – Eric XIV

Events

 February - Sweden pillage the Norwegian provinces of Jämtland, Härjedalen and Trondheim.
 19 February - Armistice between Sweden and Denmark-Norway in Swedish Estonia. 
 30–31 May - First battle of Öland (1564)
 14 August – Swedish siege of Lyckå in Blekinge.
 14 August - Action of 14 August 1564
 24 August - Lyckå taken by the Swedes. 
 4 September - Sweden takes Danish Ronneby and creates a massacre on its inhabitants called Ronneby blodbad (Ronneby Bloodbath).
 June - Wedding between Princess Cecilia of Sweden and Christopher II, Margrave of Baden-Rodemachern. 
 27 September – Lyckås and Avaskär are burned by the Swedes who then evacuate Blekinge. 
 11–13 October – Danish attack on Kalmar repelled. 
 21 November – Peace treaty between Sweden and Russia, to last for seven years.

Births

 25 September - Magnus Brahe (1564–1633), Lord High Constable and Lord High Steward of Sweden  (died 1633)

Deaths

References

 
Years of the 16th century in Sweden
Sweden